Beberibe River is a river located in Pernambuco, Brazil. The river rises in the city of Camaragibe from the confluence of the rivers Araçá and Pacas, and is 23.7 km long. Its drainage basin measures 81 square kilometers and includes the following cities: Recife ( 65% ), Olinda ( 21% ) and Camaragibe ( 14% ). Today, the main tributaries are the Euclides channel, Malaria channel and Vasco da Gama channel all located in Recife metropolitan area. The Beberibe meets the Capibaribe River  near to the end of Aurora street (Recife city center) to flow into the Atlantic Ocean. The name Beberibe means where the sugar cane grows.
Also, in Recife Beberibe could be a neighborhood with the eponymous name.

References

Rivers of Pernambuco